Lupe Gigliotti (1 July 1926 – 19 December 2010) was a Brazilian television, stage, and film actress.

Gigliotti was born Maria Paula Viana Lupicina in Maranguape, Ceará, Brazil, on 1 July 1926. She was the sister of Brazilian actor and comedian Chico Anysio and the aunt of actor Marcos Palmeira. She began acting professionally during the 1960s, appearing in 11 films during her career.

Gigliotti became famous for her role as Dona Escolástica on the comedic television show, Escolinha do Professor Raimundo. She played Signora Botega in the 1984 American film Blame It on Rio.

Gigliotti's last television appearance was on the Globo telenovela, Cama de Gato, as Áurea in early 2010.

Lupe Gigliotti died at her home in Copacabana, Rio de Janeiro, on 19 December 2010, at the age of 84. She had been suffering from lung cancer.

Filmography

References

External links

1926 births
2010 deaths
20th-century Brazilian actresses
Brazilian film actresses
Brazilian stage actresses
Actresses from Rio de Janeiro (city)
21st-century Brazilian actresses
Brazilian television actresses
Brazilian telenovela actresses
Deaths from lung cancer
Deaths from cancer in Rio de Janeiro (state)